The Río Cachirí Group (PZc) is a geological group of the Cesar-Ranchería Basin, Colombia and the Serranía del Perijá of the northernmost Colombian and Venezuelan Andes. The group contains abundant fauna; crinoids, bryozoa, brachiopods and molluscs have been found in the group.

Etymology and definition 
The formation was defined by Liddle in 1928 in Río Cachirí, part of Mara, Zulia, in the Venezuelan part of the Serranía del Perijá, and the same author subdivided the group into three formations in 1943. In 1972, Bowen added a fourth formation to the group.

Description

Lithologies 
The group contains black, grey and red shales, grey micaceous sandstones, quartzitic sandstones and red and bluish grey limestones.

Stratigraphy and correlation 
The Río Cachirí Group, dated to span the Devonian, is subdivided into the Caño Grande, Caño del Oeste, Campo Chico and Los Guineos Formations. The group unconformably overlies the Perijá Formation and is overlain by an unnamed Carboniferous sequence. The Río Cachirí Group is time-equivalent with the Floresta and Cuche Formations of the Floresta Massif, Altiplano Cundiboyacense and the Quetame Group of the Eastern Ranges. The sediments of the Río Cachirí Group were deposited in an epicontinental sea at the edge of the Paleo-Tethys Ocean.

Fossil content 
The group contains abundant fossils of crinoids, bryozoa, brachiopods and molluscs as Acrospirifer olssoni, Spirifer kingi, Leptaena boyaca, Fenestella venezuelansis, Neospirifer latus, Composita subtilita, Phricodrotis planoconvexa and Pecten sp.

Outcrops 

Apart from its type locality on the eastern flank of the Serranía del Perijá in Zulia, Venezuela, the formation is also found in other parts of the mountain range, on the Colombian western side in the east of San Diego and Curumaní, Cesar.

Regional correlations

See also 

 Geology of the Eastern Hills
 Geology of the Ocetá Páramo
 Geology of the Altiplano Cundiboyacense

Notes

References

Bibliography

Maps 
 
 

Geologic groups of South America
Geologic formations of Colombia
Geologic formations of Venezuela
Formations
Devonian System of South America
Devonian Colombia
Devonian Venezuela
Shale formations
Sandstone formations
Limestone formations
Shallow marine deposits
Fossiliferous stratigraphic units of South America
Paleontology in Colombia
Paleontology in Venezuela
Formations
Formations
Formations
Colombia–Venezuela border